Colonel I Gusti Ngurah Rai (30 January 1917 – 20 November 1946) was an Indonesian National Hero who commanded Indonesian forces in Bali against the Dutch during the Indonesian War of Independence. He was killed in the Battle of Margarana.

Early life
Ngurah Rai was born in Carangsari, Badung Regency, Bali on 30 January 1917. He studied at a Dutch elementary school named HIS Denpasar, then went to MULO junior high school in Malang, East Java. He then received Dutch military training at the Military Cadet School in Gianyar, Bali and Magelang, Central Java. After graduating, he joined the Dutch-sponsored military as a second lieutenant in Bali. After that he studied at Corps Opleiding Voor Reserve Officieren (CORO), Magelang and pendidikan artileri, Malang.

Military career

After the Indonesian Declaration of Independence he established the People's Security Army, the forerunner of the military of Indonesia, for the Lesser Sunda Islands. He then left for the republican capital, Yogyakarta to receive orders before returning to Bali to oppose the approximately 2,000 Dutch troops who had landed on 2 and 3 March 1946.

Ngurah Rai found that the republican forces were divided and he worked hard to reunite them. He then organized the first attack against the headquarters of the Dutch force at Tabanan. The Dutch then attempted to locate Ngurah Rai's base and offered negotiations, which he refused.

On 20 November 1946, the Dutch launched a large attack on Marga with the assistance of troops from Lombok and supported by aircraft. Lieutenant Colonel Ngurah Rai ordered a Puputan, or fight to the last man. He died along with all of his troops. The battle is now known as the Battle of Margarana. However, because Ngurah Rai's entire force was wiped out, including the military leadership, the Dutch forces were subsequently unopposed and were able to regain control of Bali. This may not have been possible had Ngurah Rai adopted a guerrilla strategy.

Burial and national hero status

Ngurah Rai was buried in Marga. On 9 August 1975, he was made a national hero via Presidential Decision No. 063/TK/TH 1975. Ngurah Rai International Airport in Bali is named for him and he appears on the IDR 50,000 note.

Notes

References 

 Mutiara Sumber Widya (publisher) (1999) Album Pahlawan Bangsa (Album of National Heroes), Jakarta (Indonesian)
 
 Sudarmanto, Y.B. (1996) Jejak-Jejak Pahlawan dari Sultan Agung hingga Syekh Yusuf (The Footsteps of Heroes from Sultan Agung to Syekh Yusuf), Penerbit Grasindo, Jakarta  (Indonesian)

National Heroes of Indonesia
Balinese people
Indonesian Hindus
History of Bali
1917 births
1946 deaths
People from Badung Regency
Indonesian military personnel